

Canadian football news in 1894

Final regular season standings
Note: GP = Games Played, W = Wins, L = Losses, T = Ties, PF = Points For, PA = Points Against, Pts = Points
*Bold text means that they have clinched the playoffs

League Champions

Playoffs

QRFU Final

ORFU Semi-Finals

ORFU Final

Dominion Championship

References

 
Canadian Football League seasons